The M21 highway was a road in Moldova, which linked Chișinău to the border with Ukraine near Dubău via Dubăsari. Furthermore, it also shared a small segment with the E58 and E581 north-west of Chișinău.

In 2016, a government decision decommissioned the M21 and integrated the entirety of the route into the M1 highway.

Route description
The M21 highway began at an intersection with the R1 road west of the capital city of Chișinău. Heading north-east, it then met with the M2, M14 (now dubbed "M5") and R4. This was the northern terminus of the M21's interference with the E58 and E581 and the southern terminus of the interference with the European route E584.

Between Chișinău and Dubăsari, the road doubled the republican road R4, which has its eastern terminus near Criuleni. The road then crossed the Dniester to reach the unrecognized state of Transnistria.

Immediately after entering the Transnistrian territory, the road reached a roundabout with the M4 highway, which provides access to Dubăsari, which the M21 bypassed in the south-east. The road then continued to head north-east to the border with Ukraine near Dubău, from where it continues as the Ukrainian highway M13, towards Kropyvnytskyi.

See also
Roads in Moldova
Transport in Moldova

References

Gallery

Roads in Moldova